Donald Maurice Bryant (born April 4, 1942) is an American rhythm and blues singer and songwriter.

Early life
Bryant was born in  Memphis, Tennessee, United States, the fifth of ten children.  He began singing in church at age 5, and soon joined his father's family vocal group.  He eventually formed a gospel quartet for a high school radio show, finding success singing secular pop songs on Dick “Cane” Cole’s popular WLOK show. The quartet, performing as The Four Kings, would part with Cole to become the front band for Willie Mitchell, with Bryant as the lead singer.

Hi Records
In 1960, the still teenage Bryant was offered a shot at songwriting, penning “I Got To Know” for The 5 Royales. He wrote material for other artists at Hi Records while continuing to record with The Four Kings and as a solo artist, resulting in a 1969 solo album. However, with the success of Al Green, Otis Clay, and other vocalists at Hi, Bryant’s singing career took a backseat to writing, joining Earl Randle, Dan Greer, and Darryl Carter as Hi's top staff writers. Bryant is credited on as many as 154 titles.

By 1970, Willie Mitchell had begun to pair Bryant with his newest act, a young Ann Peebles, for whom he wrote "99 Pounds" and "Do I Need You." The pair co-wrote the Top 40 hit "I Can't Stand the Rain" in 1973, and were married the following year. Bryant spent much of the subsequent decade writing and opening for Peebles, with his final Hi single coming in 1981, a duet with his wife called "Mon Belle-Amour."

Bryant focused mainly on gospel albums throughout the 1980s and 1990s, and ultimately stopped performing altogether outside of church services.

Return to performing

Following a conversation between producer Scott Bomar and former Hi Records drummer Howard Grimes, Bryant was invited to perform as a vocalist with Memphis-based soul homage outfit The Bo-Keys. After some convincing from Grimes, Bryant accepted and, within a few months, found the inspiration to return to the studio. Bryant and The Bo-Keys recorded Don’t Give Up on Love in the fall of 2016, which was released on the Fat Possum label in 2017. The album features an array of Bryant’s past triumphs as well as new material.
In 2020 Bryant and the Bo-Keys collaborated again on the Fat Possum Records release You Make Me Feel which was nominated for a Grammy in 2020.

Discography
Precious Soul (Hi Records), 1969
Don't Give Up on Love (Fat Possum Records), 2017
You Make Me Feel (Fat Possum Records), 2020
A World Like That (single) (Fat Possum Records), 2021

As Donald Bryant and a Chosen Few
What Do You Think About Jesus? (By Faith Records), 1987
I’m Gonna Praise Him (By Faith Records), 1989
It’s All in the Word (By Faith Records), 2000

References

External links
An in-depth interview with Soul Express in May 2017
Don Bryant talks about his 2020 CD, You Make Me Feel

1942 births
American rhythm and blues singer-songwriters
Singer-songwriters from Tennessee
American soul singers
Living people
Musicians from Memphis, Tennessee